Pierre da Silva (born July 28, 1998) is an American soccer player who plays as a forward for Miami FC in the USL Championship.

Career

He was acquired by Orlando City B in January 2016.

He signed an MLS contract with Orlando City in January 2017. On March 24, 2017, he was sent on a season-long loan to Orlando City B. During the 2017 USL season, da Silva was ranked the No. 1 player in the United Soccer League's "20 Under 20" list.

On March 2, 2018, da Silva was suspended for three games for use of offensive language during a preseason scrimmage.

On May 24, 2018, he was loaned to Saint Louis FC, reuniting him with OCB head coach Anthony Pulis. He featured in one game versus Colorado Springs Switchbacks FC before returning. On July 18, da Silva returned to Saint Louis for a second time. He scored a 79th-minute equalizer in a 2–2 draw with Orange County SC in his first game back.

On March 18, 2019, da Silva joined Orlando's Brazilian partner club Athletico Paranaense on loan for the season. On July 31, 2019, da Silva and Orlando City mutually agreed to part ways.

Following his release from Orlando, da Silva joined USL Championship side Memphis 901.

On January 14, 2021, da Silva was signed by USL Championship side Miami FC.

International
He was in the United States U17 squad for the 2015 FIFA U-17 World Cup and made one appearance in the opening group game against Nigeria.

He is also eligible to play for Brazil through his father and Peru through his mother.

Career statistics

Club

References

External links

 Pierre da Silva at Orlando City SC
 

1998 births
Living people
American sportspeople of Brazilian descent
American sportspeople of Peruvian descent
American soccer players
Association football forwards
Major League Soccer players
Miami FC players
Memphis 901 FC players
Orlando City SC players
Orlando City B players
People from Port Chester, New York
Soccer players from New York (state)
United States men's youth international soccer players
USL Championship players